An Iltizām (Arabic التزام) was a form of tax farm that appeared in the 15th century in the Ottoman Empire. The system began under Mehmed the Conqueror and was abolished during the Tanzimat reforms in 1856.

Iltizams were sold off by the government to wealthy notables, who would then reap up to five times the amount they had paid by taxing the peasants and extracting agricultural production.  It was a system that was very profitable and was of great benefit to the Egyptian aristocracy under the Mameluks, and helped create a large and powerful elite.  In Egypt, it was abolished by Muhammad Ali as part of his centralization efforts in the early nineteenth century.

The holder of an Iltizām was a mültezim (ملتزم).

Iltizām was typically an annual agreement; malikâne, developed as a replacement for Iltizām, was for life.

References

Further reading 
 Abd Al-Rahim / Y. Nagata: The Iltizam System in Egypt and Turkey - A Comparative Study. JaAAS, 14 (1977), 169-194.

Ottoman Egypt
Arabic words and phrases
Land management in the Ottoman Empire
Taxation in the Ottoman Empire